Andreas Kouvelogiannis (born 7 March 1939) is a Greek athlete. He competed in the men's hammer throw at the 1960 Summer Olympics.

References

External links
 

1939 births
Living people
Athletes (track and field) at the 1960 Summer Olympics
Greek male hammer throwers
Olympic athletes of Greece
Athletes from Athens
Mediterranean Games bronze medalists for Greece
Mediterranean Games medalists in athletics
Athletes (track and field) at the 1959 Mediterranean Games
20th-century Greek people